The 2003 Walker Cup, the 39th Walker Cup Match, was played on 6 and 7 September 2003, at Ganton Golf Club in North Yorkshire, England. The event was won by Great Britain and Ireland 12½ to 11½, marking the first time that Great Britain & Ireland had three consecutive wins.

Format
The format for play on Saturday and Sunday was the same. There were four matches of foursomes in the morning and eight singles matches in the afternoon. In all, 24 matches were played.

Each of the 24 matches is worth one point in the larger team competition. If a match is all square after the 18th hole extra holes are not played. Rather, each side earns ½ a point toward their team total. The team that accumulates at least 12½ points wins the competition.

Teams
Ten players for the USA and Great Britain & Ireland participate in the event plus one non-playing captain for each team.

Saturday's matches

Morning foursomes

Afternoon singles

Sunday's matches

Morning foursomes

Afternoon singles

References
 http://www.walkercup.org/2003/index.html(  2009-06-24)

Walker Cup
Golf tournaments in England
Sport in North Yorkshire
Walker Cup
Walker Cup
Walker Cup